Isabella Dujmenović (born 16 July 1995) is a Croatian footballer who plays as a defender and has appeared for the Croatia women's national team.

Career
Dujmenović has been capped for the Croatia national team, appearing for the team during the 2019 FIFA Women's World Cup qualifying cycle. Since 2022/2023 she is playing for FCM Traiskirchen.

References

External links
 
 
 

1995 births
Living people
Croatian women's footballers
Croatia women's international footballers
Women's association football defenders